Turlava Parish is an administrative unit of Kuldīga Municipality in the Courland region of Latvia. The parish has a population of 969 (as of 1/07/2010) and covers an area of 124.51 km2.

Villages of Turlava parish 

 Grantiņi
 Jāmaiķi
 Kalējciems
 Kazlēnciems
 Klostere
 Krievciems
 Ķikuri
 Ķoniņciems
 Maras
 Turlava
 Valāti
 Ziemeļciems

See also 
 Curonian Kings

External links 
 Turlava parish in Latvian

Parishes of Latvia
Kuldīga Municipality
Courland